The Galleria Tower is a 17-story, 375,000 square foot (26,000 m²) office building located at the Riverchase Galleria in the Hoover suburb of Birmingham, Alabama, United States. The building was developed by Jim Wilson & Associates as a part of the Riverchase Galleria. Construction began in 1983 and was completed in 1986. The building connects to the Galleria via a large glass atrium.

The building is the tallest office building outside of the Downtown Birmingham District.

Location at the Galleria
In 1986 when the Galleria opened it was accessed by a ramp behind Macy's on the exterior and the food court elevator up at the third floor on the interior. Later the tower was connected to both the JCPenney parking deck and the Sears parking deck. This allowed easy access from the exterior and parking to the offices. Von Maur's third floor includes an exit that leads outside and directly across to the tower.

Tenants
One of the major tenants of the building is Walter Energy. MedPartners was headquartered in the building from 1993 until 2004. For a period of time the MedPartners logo was displayed at the top of the building, but it was removed following the company changing its name to Caremark Rx in 2000. Caremark relocated from the building in 2004. Surgical Care Affiliates relocated at the start of 2015. KBR (Kellogg Brown and Root) Birmingham have plans to move to the tower in May 2016.

See also 
 List of tallest buildings in Birmingham, Alabama

References

External links
 Emporis Website

Hoover, Alabama
Skyscraper office buildings in Birmingham, Alabama
Office buildings completed in 1986
Buildings and structures in Jefferson County, Alabama
1986 establishments in Alabama